Fancy Creek Township is located in Sangamon County, Illinois. As of the 2010 census, its population was 5,410 and it contained 2,074 housing units. Fancy Creek Township changed its name from Power Township on September 11, 1861.  The township annexed the eastern half of Salisbury Township in 1989, thereby increasing in size.

The Sangamon River State Fish and Wildlife Area, a state-owned conservation area, is located here on the banks of the Sangamon River.

Geography

Demographics

References

External links

City-data.com
Illinois State Archives

Townships in Sangamon County, Illinois
Springfield metropolitan area, Illinois
Townships in Illinois
1860 establishments in Illinois
Populated places established in 1860